Deadline: White House is an American news and politics television program airing weekdays from 4 to 6 p.m. ET on MSNBC. It is hosted by NBC News senior political analyst Nicolle Wallace.

History 
The show premiered on May 9, 2017. Deadline was created as a late afternoon political interview and discussion show, similar in style to the network's highly successful morning program, Morning Joe.

The program is also meant to take advantage of Wallace's deep political connections, the result of her years working for the George W. Bush Administration and the John McCain presidential campaign in 2008. With the launch of this broadcast, Wallace continues her role as fill-in host on MSNBC's The 11th Hour with Brian Williams.

On August 3, 2020, it was announced that Deadline: White House would expand into a two-hour program beginning on August 17, as part of MSNBC's new weekday afternoon lineup. The series' second hour effectively moved MTP Daily into an early afternoon slot.

References

External links 

 Official Website

2017 American television series debuts
2010s American television news shows
2010s American television talk shows
2020s American television news shows
2020s American television talk shows
English-language television shows
MSNBC original programming